16th Street Mission station is a Bay Area Rapid Transit station located under Mission Street at 16th Street in the Mission District of San Francisco, California. Service at the station began, along with other stations between Montgomery Street Station and the Daly City station, on November 5, 1973.

Station design 

16th Street Mission station has two escalator and stair banks at the northeast and southwest corners of the intersection, which lead to a mezzanine under the intersection. A single row of faregates connects to a vaulted paid mezzanine centered over the platform area. The station has a single island platform serving two tracks. 24th Street Mission station has an identical design. Both stations have concrete reliefs by William Mitchell on the walls of their entrances, as well as colorful tilework on the mezzanine and platform levels.

An early-2000s renovation of the southwest plaza added several additional art pieces. These include Palaza del Colibri by Victor Mario Zaballa – colorful metal railings depicting hummingbirds – and Future Roads by Jos Sances and Daniel Galvez, a screen printed tile mural around the entrance.

References

External links 

BART – 16th Street Mission

Bay Area Rapid Transit stations in San Francisco
Mission District, San Francisco
Stations on the Yellow Line (BART)
Stations on the Green Line (BART)
Stations on the Red Line (BART)
Stations on the Blue Line (BART)
Railway stations in the United States opened in 1973